This is an incomplete list of rural localities in Smolensk Oblast. Smolensk Oblast, (Smolenskaya oblast), known informally as Smolenschina is a federal subject of Russia (an oblast). Its administrative center is the city of Smolensk. As of the 2010 Census, its population was 985,537.

Locations 
Agaponovough
Bibishki
Glinka — selo, administrative center of Glinkovsky District
Gnyozdovo
Gusino
Kadino
Katyn
Klushino
Krasatinka
Lyubavichi
Novodugino — selo, administrative center of Novoduginsky District
Ostyor
Pechersk
Petrovichi
Ray
Sneberka
Talashkino
Tsaryovo-Zaymishche
Tyomkino
Vorga
Yershichi — selo, administrative center of Yershichsky District

See also
 
 Lists of rural localities in Russia

References

Smolensk